Gary LeVox (born Gary Wayne Vernon Jr., July 10, 1970) is an American singer and songwriter. He is known for being the lead vocalist of the contemporary country music band Rascal Flatts, and his stage name was taken from the studio-console label for his lead-vocal track.

Biography

Early life 
LeVox was born in Powell, Ohio. LeVox's first musical performance was at the age of eight, in a play at his church. He graduated from Olentangy High School and is an alumnus of Ohio State University. Prompted by his cousin, LeVox moved to Nashville, Tennessee, in 1997.

LeVox and his second cousin, Jay DeMarcus, started out together in singer Chely Wright's band. One day, when the regular guitarist was not available, Joe Don Rooney stepped in. The three men say they felt the chemistry immediately and afterwards formed Rascal Flatts.

Post-Rascal Flatts 
The band disbanded in 2021, after which LeVox began releasing solo music. In May 2021, he released his first solo EP, One on One. This was followed in 2022 by a single titled "Get Down Like That" on Big Machine Records, the label to which Rascal Flatts was previously signed.

Personal life
LeVox has been friends with Jamie Foxx since the mid-1990s, and Foxx made a guest appearance on the album Still Feels Good.

LeVox was employed in his local burger bar from age 14 after which he started an AC/DC cover band with his close childhood friends. 
 
LeVox has been married to Tara Vernon since May 1999. He says it was love at first sight when they met backstage at a gospel festival concert. "I knew at that moment that I was looking at my future wife," he said in a 2011 interview. "It was the weirdest thing ever." They now have two daughters together, Brittany, born in 2000, and Brooklyn, born in 2004.

Discography

Rascal Flatts (2000)
Melt (2002)
Feels Like Today (2004)
Me and My Gang (2006)
Still Feels Good (2007)
Unstoppable (2009)
Nothing Like This (2010)
Changed (2012)
Rewind (2014)
The Greatest Gift of All (2016)
Back to Us (2017)

References

External links

1970 births
American country singer-songwriters
American male singer-songwriters
Living people
Singer-songwriters from Ohio
Ohio State University alumni
Musicians from Columbus, Ohio
Rascal Flatts members
American people of French-Canadian descent
21st-century American singers
Country musicians from Ohio
21st-century American male singers
Big Machine Records artists